Jimmy Franklin Garner (born January 4, 1969) is the democratic mayor pro-tem of Pine Level, Johnston County, North Carolina. He is the third generation of Town commissioners in the Garner family. He ran against N. Leo Daughtry in 2009 for North Carolina House of Representatives District 49, but lost by 3,745 votes. He was Daughtry's first ever opponent.

Political background 
Garner was first elected as town commissioner in Pine level, Johnston County, North Carolina in 2003 and still currently serving Pine Level. In 2008 he chose to run against N. Leo Daughtry being Daughtrys' first opponent ever. Jimmy's slogan was that "He was for the working people". He has served as statewide treasurer and vice president of the State Employees Association, the nation’s largest non-union public employee’s association.

Personal life 
Garner was the son of Franklin Garner and Janice Faye Woodard, and is a Pine Level, Johnston County, North Carolina native. He was North Johnston High school class of '87. He later married Gina Lynn Mangum, and they had a son and daughter (Jacob Trevor, and MacKenzie Lynn Garner). 2007 he lost his home to a fire, he later said “I cannot thank the people of Pine Level enough. They have been so supportive and have reached out to us, offering places to rent, money, clothes and pots and pans.” He worked 20 years for State employee, Department of Corrections. He retired and started up his own towing company.

References

http://kenlynews.com/pine-levels-jimmy-garner-challenging-leo-daughtry-p5023-228.htm#sthash.DmaOSqXz.dpuf 
http://projects.newsobserver.com/under_the_dome/profiles/jimmy_garner
http://kenlynews.com/pl-family-looses-all-in-house-fire-p3531-74.htm#sthash.0mst82qP.dpuf

People from Johnston County, North Carolina
Living people
1969 births